The 2011 FIFA Women's World Cup qualification UEFA Group 2 was a UEFA qualifying group for the 2011 FIFA Women's World Cup. The group comprised Norway, the Netherlands, Macedonia, Belarus and Slovakia. 

Norway won the group and advanced to the play-off rounds.

Standings

 Norway win Group 2 and advance to the UEFA play-off rounds.

Results

Goalscorers
9 goals
  Isabell Herlovsen
8 goals
  Sylvia Smit
6 goals
  Dana Fecková
5 goals

  Marina Lis
  Annemieke Kiesel-Griffioen
  Manon Melis
  Lisa-Marie Woods

4 goals

  Solveig Gulbrandsen
  Trine Bjerke Rønning

3 goals

  Yekaterina Aukhimovich
  Emilie Haavi
  Lene Mykjåland
  Lise Klaveness
  Veronika Klechová

2 goals

  Viktoria Krylova
  Chantal de Ridder
  Daphne Koster
  Renée Slegers
  Ingvild Stensland
  Andrea Budošová
  Lucia Haršányová

1 goal

  Alena Buzinova
  Alina Vasilyeva
  Ekaterina Aukhimovich
  Elvira Urazaeva
  Anna Pilipenko
  Irina Nikolaeva
  Tatyana Shramok
  Afrodita Saliihi
  Natasa Andonova
  Violeta Spirovska
  Anouk Dekker
  Anouk Hoogendijk
  Kirsten van de Ven
  Manoe Meulen
  Marlous Pieëte
  Sherida Spitse
  Anneli Giske
  Cecilie Pedersen
  Elise Thorsnes
  Runa Vikestad
  Eva Kolenová
  Lucia Ondrušová

Own goals

  Alexandra Bíróová
  Maria Korenciová

External links
 Regulations of the European Qualifying Competition for the 6th FIFA Women's World Cup

2
2009–10 in Dutch women's football
2010–11 in Dutch women's football
2009–10 in Republic of Macedonia football
2010–11 in Republic of Macedonia football
2009–10 in Slovak football
2010–11 in Slovak football
2009 in Belarusian football
2010 in Belarusian football
2009 in Norwegian women's football
2010 in Norwegian women's football
Qual
FIFA